The Edgar Street Grid is a redevelopment project in the north of Hereford, England, estimated to cost almost £1 billion and intended to restore the city as a key shopping and business destination in the region. Work was expected to start in 2010.

Zones
The project creates three distinct but interlinked zones - the Retail/Leisure Quarter, on the council-owned  old livestock market; the Civic Quarter, to contain a mix of public buildings, private offices, shops and restaurants; and the new Blackfriars Urban Village, where around 800 new homes will be built.  A centrepiece to the regeneration will be a new canal basin at the end of the Herefordshire and Gloucestershire Canal, which is currently undergoing restoration.

References

External links

 Hereford Future's website (formerly Edgar Street Grid)
 Developer's website

Hereford